The 38th World Science Fiction Convention (Worldcon), also known as Noreascon Two, was held on 29 August–1 September 1980 at the Sheraton-Boston Hotel and Hynes Civic Auditorium in Boston, Massachusetts, United States.

The chairman was Leslie Turek. The supporting organization was Massachusetts Convention Fandom, Inc.

Participants 

Attendance was approximately 5,850.

Guests of Honor 

 Damon Knight (pro)
 Kate Wilhelm (pro)
 Bruce Pelz (fan)
 Robert Silverberg (toastmaster)

Awards

1980 Hugo Awards 

 Best Novel: The Fountains of Paradise by Arthur C. Clarke
 Best Novella: "Enemy Mine" by Barry B. Longyear
 Best Novelette: "Sandkings" by George R. R. Martin
 Best Short Story: "The Way of Cross and Dragon" by George R. R. Martin
 Best Non-Fiction Book: The Encyclopedia of Science Fiction, edited by Peter Nicholls
 Best Dramatic Presentation: Alien
 Best Professional Editor: George H. Scithers
 Best Professional Artist: Michael Whelan
 Best Fanzine: Locus, edited by Charles N. Brown
 Best Fan Writer: Bob Shaw
 Best Fan Artist: Alexis Gilliland

Other awards 

 John W. Campbell Award for Best New Writer: Barry B. Longyear
 Gandalf Grand Master Award: Ray Bradbury

See also 

 Hugo Award
 Science fiction
 Speculative fiction
 World Science Fiction Society
 Worldcon

References

External links 

 NESFA.org: The Long List
 NESFA.org: 1980 convention notes 
 Hugo.org: 1980 Hugo Awards

1980 conferences
1980 in Boston
1980 in the United States
August 1980 events in the United States
Science fiction conventions in the United States
September 1980 events in the United States
Worldcon